Sepia gibba is a species of cuttlefish native to the Red Sea. The depth range of S. gibba is unknown, although it is at least as shallow as 1 m.

Sepia gibba grows to a mantle length of 100 mm.

The type specimen was collected in the Red Sea and is deposited at the Zoologisches Museum in Berlin.

References

External links

Cuttlefish
Cephalopods described in 1845
Taxa named by Christian Gottfried Ehrenberg